Mihaela Buzărnescu and Elise Mertens were the defending champions, but both players chose not to participate.

Caroline Dolehide and María Irigoyen won the title, defeating Kaitlyn Christian and Giuliana Olmos in the final, 6–4, 6–4.

Seeds

Draw

References
Main Draw

Abierto Tampico - Doubles